The 2009 ESC Youth League was the inaugural season for the ESC Youth League in 10 metre air rifle and 10 metre air pistol, for shooters born 1991–1995. Three regional competitions were held in May, and six teams per event advanced to the final round, held in Helsingør, Denmark, on 3–4 October.

Eastern region

The Eastern regional qualification groups were held in Belgrade on 30 and 31 May. Russia, Serbia, Croatia and Bulgaria had entered teams in both events, Bosnia and Herzegovina only in air rifle, and Romania only in air pistol. Thus, no teams had to be eliminated prior to the qualification stage. Romania and Bulgaria withdrew before the qualification stage.

Serbia and Croatia advanced in air rifle, while the Russians won both their air pistol matches 3–0 and advanced together with Serbia.

Air rifle round-robin

All times are local (UTC+2).

Air pistol round-robin

All times are local (UTC+2).

Northern region

In the Northern region, Poland (1168), Norway (1167), Finland (1166), Denmark (1163) and Sweden (1163) qualified from the 2008 preliminary air rifle rounds while Latvia (1142) and Lithuania (1139) were eliminated. In air pistol, all five teams (Poland, Sweden, Lithuania, Finland and Norway) qualified. Finland, while qualified in both events, withdrew from the competition before the qualification stage.

The Northern regional qualification groups were held in Rottne, Sweden, on 23 and 24 May. The air rifle group was dominated by Sweden, achieving the highest possible total (9–0), with Poland finishing second; the same teams advanced in air pistol, although in reversed order.

Air rifle round-robin

All times are local (UTC+2).

Air pistol round-robin

All times are local (UTC+2).

Western region

In the Western region, joint preliminary rounds were held in 2008 at Nitra (Slovakia) and Fleury-les-Aubrais (France). In air rifle, Spain (1166), Italy (1164), Hungary (1163), Slovakia (1159) and Slovenia (1157) qualified for the group stage while France (1153), Austria (1148), Luxembourg (1111) and Belgium (1096) were eliminated. Slovakia withdrew prior to the qualification stage and were replaced by France. Spain (1116), Italy (1100) and Slovenia (1094) also had qualified in air pistol, along with Belgium (1096) and France (1094). Slovakia (1083) and Hungary (1078) were eliminated.

The Western regional qualification groups were held in Milan on 30 and 31 May, just after Milan's 2009 ISSF World Cup competition. Hungary and Slovenia advanced to the finals in air rifle, Spain and Italy in air pistol.

Air rifle round-robin

All times are local (UTC+2).

Air pistol round-robin

All times are local (UTC+2).

Finals
The finals were held in Helsingør, Denmark, on 3–4 October. They were originally scheduled for Copenhagen but had to be moved because of weapon regulations surrounding the 13th Olympic Congress, held simultaneously in the capital.

The top two teams from each region qualified for the finals, where they were divided into two groups of three teams each. Round-robins were held in these groups on Saturday. The next day, the group runners-up faced each other for the bronze medals, and the group winners competed for the gold medals.

Air rifle, group 1

All times are local (UTC+2).

Air rifle, group 2

All times are local (UTC+2).

Air pistol, group 1

All times are local (UTC+2).

Air pistol, group 2
Serbia had qualified for this group but withdrew; to compensate for this, the remaining teams faced each other twice.

All times are local (UTC+2).

Medal matches

All times are local (UTC+2).

Bronze medal match, air pistol

Bronze medal match, air rifle

Final, air pistol

Final, air rifle

External links
Official website
Official finals website

ISSF shooting competitions
ESC Youth League
2009 in Danish sport
International sports competitions hosted by Denmark